balans (stylised in lowercase) is a band from Ljubljana, Slovenia that has been producing music since 2013. Their first concert was held in Umag, Croatia at the first edition of Indirekt festival. Since 2016, they have been collaborating with Italian contemporary artist Alessandro di Giampietro, with whom they present an audiovisual concert experience to the audience.

History 
Their debut physical album, titled Bunkerpop, was released in 2017 by the independent label ŠOP Records.

In February 2018, ŠOP Records released also their second physical album titled Kva je s tabo... with critical acclaims. The same year they were chosen to perform on the 18th tour of Club Marathon, which Radio Študent organises in order to support and promote the domestic musical scene.

In January 2019, they were invited to perform at the 5th edition of Ment Festival in Ljubljana. On May 13, their next physical album was released A vam je jasno (again at ŠOP Records), which they promoted with a concert tour from Vienna to Skopje. In that time, they were chosen as one of the INES Talent 2020 and got more positive reviews regarding their work.

After their tour, they were invited to an art residency at Layer House in Kranj and free to pick the collaborator(s) of their choice. Balans invited members of Belgrade independent label Krava 22 of the art space Kvaka 22 and recorded an album under the name New Balkan Wife.

In January 2020, they recorded their sixth studio album Sam pravm at Radio Študent Ljubljana. It was later released later in the year at the independent record label KAPA Records.

Members 

 Alessandro di Giampietro – visual representation of the band (2016–)
 Andrej Pervanje – bass guitar, vocals, drum machine (2013–)
 Kristin Čona – vocals, electric guitar, bass guitar (2013–)
Jan Kmet – drums (2020–)

Discography

Albums 

 Praske na parketu (self-released, 2015)
 LPT (self-released, 2016)
 Bunkerpop (ŠOP Records, 2017)
 Kva je s tabo ... včer sm šou na bus, voznik ni hotu, da grem, brez da plačam urbano, pa mu rečem sori, k ta mesec nisem dobil plače, pa mi reče jz tud ne, pol me on gleda kva je s tabo pa ga jz gledam kva je s tabo, pol grem na bus pa je vse v redu (ŠOP Records, 2018)
 A vam je jasno (ŠOP Records, 2019)
 Sam pravm (KAPA Records, 2020)

Compilations 

 Klubski maraton 2018 (ZARŠ, 2018)
Sounds from Slovenian Bedroom (ŠOP Records, 2018)
Slovenian moMENT 2019 (MENT, 2019)
Sounds from Slovenian Bedrooms II (ŠOP Records, 2019)
Sounds from Slovenian Bedrooms III α & Ω (ŠOP Records, 2020)
ŠOP xmas (s)hits (ŠOP Records, 2020)

Links 

 Discography

References 

Slovenian rock music groups
Musical groups established in 2013
Slovenian musical groups
Slovenian post-punk music groups
2013 establishments in Slovenia